Rising Ballers Kensington Football Club is a semi-professional football club originally based in London, England.

History
Established as A.F.C. Hillgate in 2012, the club joined the Middlesex County League. In 2013–14 they finished third in Division Two, earning promotion to Division One Central and East. After finishing sixth in Division One Central and East in 2014–15, they switched to Division Two of the Spartan South Midlands League. A fifth-place finish in 2015–16 saw them promoted to Division One. In the summer of 2016 they were renamed Kensington Borough. At the end of the 2016–17 season the club were moved to Division One of the Combined Counties League. At the end of the 2018–19 season, the club was renamed Kensington & Ealing Borough. Prior to the 2022–23 season, the club was renamed Rising Ballers Kensington.

Ground
Having previously played at the Linford Christie Stadium in White City, the club moved to Avenue Park Stadium in Greenford for the 2015–16 season. They moved to Spratleys Meadow in Amersham for the 2016–17 season and then to the Orchard in Bedfont for the following season. Prior to the 2018–19 season the club relocated to Leatherhead's Fetcham Grove. They moved to Grand Drive, home of Raynes Park Vale, in October 2019. Prior to the 2020–21 season the club agreed a groundshare with Hanwell Town, moving to Reynolds Field in Perivale.

References

External links
Official website

 
Football clubs in England
Football clubs in London
2012 establishments in England
Association football clubs established in 2012
Middlesex County Football League
Spartan South Midlands Football League
Combined Counties Football League